Ronni Pedersen (born 6 October 1974) is a Danish motorcycle speedway rider who was a member of Denmark team at Speedway World Cups. His brother Nicki (b. 1977) is speedway rider also who is a 3 time Individual Speedway World Champion.

Career details

World Championships 
 Individual World Championship and Speedway Grand Prix
 1994 - track reserve in Danish Final
 2005 - 33rd place (3 pts in one event)
 2006 - 23rd place (23 pts in six event)
 Team World Championship (Speedway World Team Cup and Speedway World Cup)
 2002 -  Peterborough - Runner-up (7 pts)
 2003 -  Vojens - 3rd place (4 pts)
 Individual U-21 World Championship
 1994 -  Elgane - 6th place (10 pts)
 1995 -  Tampere - 8th place (7 pts)

European Championships 
 Individual European Championship
 2002 -  Rybnik - 7th place (9 pts)

See also 
 Denmark national speedway team
 List of Speedway Grand Prix riders

References

External links 
 (da) www.tms.domaintest.dk

1974 births
Living people
Danish speedway riders
People from Middelfart Municipality
King's Lynn Stars riders
Peterborough Panthers riders
Sportspeople from the Region of Southern Denmark